Vicente Gonzales Duterte (November 23, 1911 – February 21, 1968), also known by his nicknames Nene and Teti, was a Filipino politician and lawyer. He became Governor of the then-unified province of Davao, succeeding Alejandro Almendras who was elected Senator.

Early life
Duterte was born to Facundo Buot Duterte and Zoila Gonzáles from northern Cebu, who also traces her roots in Iloilo. He had four siblings and a half-brother.

Political career
Duterte previously served as Mayor of Danao, Cebu after he was appointed in that position in an acting capacity by then President Sergio Osmeña. He and his family moved to Davao in 1949. From  1959 to 1965, Duterte served as governor of Davao. On December 30, 1965, during his term as governor, Duterte was appointed to be Secretary of the Department of General Services by President Ferdinand Marcos. He collapsed in court and died of heart failure on February 21, 1968.

Personal life
Duterte was married to Soledad Roa, a teacher whom he first met at the Bureau of Public Schools. He was the father of Rodrigo Duterte, the 16th president of the Philippines, and the paternal grandfather of Rep. Paolo, Vice President Sara and Mayor Baste Duterte.

References

Mayors of places in Cebu
People from Danao, Cebu
Ferdinand Marcos administration cabinet members
1911 births
1968 deaths
20th-century Filipino lawyers
Vicente Duterte
Governors of former provinces of the Philippines